Burwick is a surname. Notable people with the surname include:

 Kimberly Burwick, American poet
 Marlene Burwick (born 1971), Swedish politician

See also
 Barwick (surname)
 Berwick (surname)
 Borwick (surname)

English-language surnames